Lacommande is a commune in the Pyrénées-Atlantiques department in south-western France.

Géography 
Lacommande township is located some 11 km of Pau, 12,3 km of Oloron-Sainte-Marie and 8,8 km of Monein, on GR653, on crossroads of D 146 and D 34.

Hydrography 
Rivers Baïse de Lasseube of Bayse flow from south to north and distinct the communes of Lacommande and commune of Aubertin. Its main tributaries flow the Lacommande territory from west to east named Seubemale stream, Brouqua stream, Bernatouse stream and the Coigdarrens stream who delimits the border with Monein.

See also
Communes of the Pyrénées-Atlantiques department

References

Communes of Pyrénées-Atlantiques